Brignolia is a genus of goblin spiders in the family Oonopidae, containing thirty one accepted species.

Species
 Brignolia ambigua (Simon, 1893) — Sri Lanka
 Brignolia ankhu Platnick et al., 2011 — Nepal
 Brignolia assam Platnick et al., 2011 — India, Nepal
 Brignolia bengal Platnick et al., 2011 — India
 Brignolia bowleri (Saaristo, 2002) — Seychelles
 Brignolia cardamom Platnick et al., 2011 — India
 Brignolia chumphae Platnick et al., 2011 — Thailand
 Brignolia cobre Platnick et al., 2011 — USA, West Indies
 Brignolia dasysterna Platnick et al., 2011 — USA
 Brignolia diablo Platnick et al., 2011 — Thailand
 Brignolia elongata Platnick et al., 2011 — Borneo
 Brignolia gading Platnick et al., 2011 — Borneo
 Brignolia jog Platnick et al., 2011 — India
 Brignolia kaikatty Platnick et al., 2011 — India
 Brignolia kapit Platnick et al., 2011 — Borneo
 Brignolia karnataka Platnick et al., 2011 — India
 Brignolia kodaik Platnick et al., 2011 — India
 Brignolia kumily Platnick et al., 2011 — India
 Brignolia mapha Platnick et al., 2011 — Thailand
 Brignolia nigripalpis (Simon, 1893) — India, Sri Lanka
 Brignolia nilgiri Platnick et al., 2011 — India
 Brignolia palawan Platnick et al., 2011 — Philippines
 Brignolia parumpunctata (Simon, 1893) — Pantropical
 Brignolia ratnapura Platnick et al., 2011 — Sri Lanka
 Brignolia rothorum Platnick et al., 2011 — India
 Brignolia schwendingeri Platnick et al., 2011 — Vietnam
 Brignolia sinharaja Platnick et al., 2011 — Sri Lanka
 Brignolia sukna Platnick et al., 2011 — Nepal
 Brignolia suthep Platnick et al., 2011 — Thailand
 Brignolia trichinalis (Benoit, 1979) — Mauritius, Seychelles, possibly Sri Lanka
 Brignolia valparai Platnick et al., 2011 — India

References 

Oonopidae
Araneomorphae genera
Spiders of Asia
Spiders of North America
Pantropical spiders